Makkah Mosque is a mosque in the city of Chennai, India. The dargah of Syed Musa Sha Khaderi is located near the masjid.

The masjid is located on Anna Salai. The five-storeyed mosque is one of the largest in India and can house 5,000 worshippers at a time.

References 

 
 

Mosques in Chennai